is a Japanese video game developer, and a division of Koei Tecmo, founded in 1995 as a part of Tecmo. It is founded and formerly led by Tomonobu Itagaki, later by Yosuke Hayashi, and is best known for the Ninja Gaiden action-adventure game series and the Dead or Alive fighting game series.

History
Team Ninja was formed by Tomonobu Itagaki from a group of game designers working at Tecmo specifically for the purpose of creating the home versions of the fighting game series Dead or Alive.

In 1999, Team Ninja started work on a new Ninja Gaiden project, originally intended for arcades, later for the Dreamcast. Due to Sega exiting the console businesss, development was moved to the PlayStation 2. However, due to Itagaki being impressed by the technological capabilities of the new Xbox from Microsoft, development was moved to that platform. Ninja Gaiden would be released in 2004 to rave critical acclaim.

Itagaki was promoted to Tecmo Executive Officer in June 2004, as well as to General Manager in 2006, alongside his position as the head of Team Ninja. In 2007 due to a lawsuit regarding alleged sexual harassment, his manager roles woud be revoked. Although he was later judged innocent by a Tokyo district court, the lawsuit permanently strained the relationship between the Itagaki and Tecmo.  On June 3, 2008, Itagaki announced that he would be leaving Tecmo and Team Ninja on July 1, 2008, citing difficulties with the company. In the same statement announcing his resignation, he also announced that he was filing a lawsuit against Tecmo president, Yoshimi Yasuda, over unpaid bonuses for his work on Dead or Alive 4 for the Xbox 360. It was later reported that he was fired from Tecmo on June 18, 2008 in retaliation for his lawsuit. Many of his colleagues at Team Ninja quit as well to join him at his new game development team, Valhalla Game Studios. Some ex-Team Ninja members also helped with Ubisoft's Teenage Mutant Ninja Turtles: Smash-Up.

In 2008, the action-adventure game Ninja Gaiden II for the Xbox 360 was published by Microsoft Game Studios, making it the first game created by Team Ninja to not be published by Tecmo; Tecmo Koei later released an enhanced version of Ninja Gaiden II on the PlayStation 3 as Ninja Gaiden Sigma 2.

In 2009, it was announced that Tecmo and Koei would be merging. The newly founded Koei Tecmo woul officially disband Tecmo in 2010. A year later all of Tecmo's assets were absorbed into Koei Tecmo, including IP and its subsidiaries and divisions. Team Ninja would continue as subsidiary of Koei Tecmo. 

Team Ninja collaborated on multiple titles with Nintendo. In 2010, Team Ninja co-developed a new Metroid action-adventure game for Nintendo's Wii console, titled Metroid: Other M. A playable Stage from Other M would appear in the Nintendo 3DS game Dead or Alive: Dimensions, which was published by Nintendo in Europe and Australia. Team Ninja would in 2014 also collaborate with Omega Force on the development of Hyrule Warriors, an action game set in The Legend of Zelda universe, and with SEGA AM2 since 2012's Dead or Alive 5, co-developing an Arcade version of the title, as well as on bringing characters from Virtua Fighter to Dead or Alive. 

In 2013, following a reconstructing of Koei Tecmo, Team Ninja would cease to exist internally, being renamed Koei Tecmo Ichigaya, with Yosuke Hayashi subsequently becoming Head of the Ichigaya Development Group. The developer was also split into two distinct development teams, one led by Ninja Gaiden Sigma director Yosuke Hayashi and one led by Fatal Frame producer Keisuke Kikuchi.

In 2016, Team Ninja garnered public attention after their decision to not release Dead or Alive Xtreme 3 in North America or Europe, resulting in a controversy within the video game industry about the sexualised portrayal of female characters within their games. Sony Interactive Entertainment CEO Shuhei Yoshida said in a statement; "It's due to cultural differences. The West has its own thinking about how to depict women in games media which is different from Japan."

In 2017, Team Ninja released their new action role-playing game Nioh to great critical response. Nioh originally started development in 2004 at Koei, and was moved between multiple developers, such as Omega Force, before Koei approached Team Ninja after the merger in 2010 to help develop the game. When first presented with the project by Koei, Team Ninja staff were skeptic about the game's concept, citing the western protagonist in Sengoku-era Japan, as well as various mechanics. Despite these uncertainties, development was fully transferred to Team Ninja in 2012.

In 2019 Team Ninja gained controversy, due to a livestream of Dead or Alive 6 at Evo Japan 2019 featuring gravure idols. The livestream was forcibly shut-down by the Evolution Championship Series, citing the stream being too explicit, and that it would go against the core values of the Esports organiser.

They released Marvel Ultimate Alliance 3: The Black Order for the Nintendo Switch in 2019 as well as Dead or Alive 6. Team Ninja released the prequel to Nioh, Nioh 2, in March 2020. A compilation of Ninja Gaiden series, dubbed Ninja Gaiden: Master Collection, released in June 2021. Team Ninja also developed Stranger of Paradise: Final Fantasy Origin, which released in 2022.

As of 2022, Yosuke Hayashi had left Team Ninja to serve as the general manager of Koei Tecmo's entertainment division, with Fumihiko Yasuda replacing him as president.

Wo Long: Fallen Dynasty was announced the same year, being produced by Team Ninja lead Fumihiko Yasuda, who led the development on Nioh and Nioh 2, as well as Masaaki Yamagiwa. Yamagiwa, who joined Team Ninja in 2021 after the closure of Sony's Japan Studio, was previously producer on Bloodborne. It is set to release in 2023.

Games

Cancelled games
 Dead or Alive: Code Chronos - A prequel to the Dead or Alive series, which was going to focus on the backstory of Kasumi and Ayane, and reportedly was not going to be a fighting game. It was cancelled in November 2010.
 Project Progressive - A project that was originally planned for the Xbox, but its development moved to the Xbox 360. It was cancelled in November 2010.
 Ninja Gaiden 3DS - A Nintendo 3DS project announced by Team Ninja in 2011. It was quietly cancelled at a later date.

References

External links

Book publishing companies of Japan
Comic book publishing companies of Japan
Japanese companies established in 1995
Koei Tecmo
Video game development companies
Video game companies established in 1995
Video game companies of Japan
Publishing companies established in 1995